Buettnererpeton is an extinct genus of large temnospondyl amphibians known from the Late Triassic Dockum Group in Texas. The type species, B. bakeri, was long classified as part of other genera, such as Metoposaurus and Koskinonodon, but was placed in its own genus in 2022.

References

Prehistoric amphibian genera
Triassic temnospondyls of North America
Trematosaurs